A̍ (lower case: a̍), called "A with vertical line", is a letter used in the standard, unified spelling in the Democratic Republic of Congo and the pe̍h-ōe-jī romanization system for writing Taiwanese Minnan. It consists of the letter A with a vertical line appearing as a diacritic above it.

Uses

Democratic Republic of Congo 
The standard, unified spelling of Democratic Republic of Congo uses the vertical line to indicate the middle tone in tonal languages needing to distinguish it. The 'a̍' represents an 'a' with a medium tone.

Taiwan 
In the pe̍h-ōe-jī and the Taiwanese romanization system used to write Minnan, the 'a̍' represents an 'a' with the tone 8 a˥˥.

Digital encoding 
The A with vertical line can be represented in Unicode as a breakdown into the following pairs of characters, each consisting of a Latin letter followed by a diacritic.

Sources 

 Draft of Proposal to add Latin characters required by Latinized Taiwanese Holo Language to ISO/IEC 10646

See also 

 Latin script
 A

Latin letters with diacritics